The Dutch Brigade was a unit of the Royal Army of the Kingdom of Holland. It was sent out in September 1808, by King Louis Bonaparte at the request of his brother Emperor Napoleon of France, to take part in the Peninsular War on the French side. The brigade, under the command of Major-General David Hendrik Chassé, was made part of the so-called "German Division". The Division also consisted of units from the Nassau, the Baden and other German allies of the French empire under command of the French general Leval. It was, in turn, part of the IVth French Corps under command of Marshals Lefebvre and Sébastiani, and was later part of the Ist Corps of Marshal Victor. The brigade distinguished itself initially in several major battles, and was later employed mainly in counter-guerrilla warfare. After the annexation of the Kingdom of Holland by the French empire in 1810, the brigade was formally decommissioned and its personnel, now French subjects, absorbed into the French 123rd Line Infantry Regiment, and later into the 130th Line Infantry Regiment, the other battalions of the 123rd back home being reassigned to the Russian campaign of 1812.

Formation of the Brigade

On 17 August 1808, Emperor Napoleon of France sent a peremptory demand to his brother, King Louis of Holland, to furnish a brigade for service in the campaign in Spain. It was to include: a cavalry regiment of 600 horses, a company of artillery with three guns and three howitzers, three battalions of infantry with a total of 2200 men, and a detachment of miners and sappers, for a grand total of 3000 men. The brigade, was to consist of veteran soldiers, and was to march within ten days of receipt of the demand. King Louis always tried his best to defend the interests of his small kingdom. Generally his policy was to drag his feet when it came his brother's demands. In this instance he found it politic to comply immediately, despite the fact that the small Dutch army (about 22,000 men) had already sent 6000 men to Germany. The Minister of War, General Janssens, and the Commander-in-Chief, Marshal Dumonceau, recommended Major-General David Hendrik Chassé as commander of the new unit. Chassé's staff would consist of Colonel A. Lycklama à Nijeholt as commander of the infantry; Major F.F.C. Steinmetz as commander of the artillery, and sappers; Colonel O.F. von Goes as commander of the cavalry (later Colonel Van Merlen); Captain H.R. Trip as commander of a company of horse artillery; and a field ambulance under command of surgeon G. Sebel. Lieutenant-Colonel Vermeulen would serve as chief of staff, assisted by captain of horse Van Zuylen van Nijevelt.

Organising the brigade proved more difficult. Initially, the first battalion of the 3rd regiment of Jagers, encamped in the province of Zeeland, was selected for the brigade. But it turned out that the regiment was so devastated by "Zeeland fever" (probably malaria) that most of its members were unfit for duty. The army leadership therefore had to replace this battalion with the 2nd battalion of the 4th regiment of the line, commanded by Lieutenant-Colonel C.L. von Pfaffenrath. The other infantry battalion designated for the brigade, commanded by Lieutenant-Colonel A.W. Storm de Grave, came from the 2nd regiment of the line in Groningen. Problems with equipment and lack of basic supplies, including shoes, also hindered the speedy deployment of the brigade. On the other hand, the cavalry, four squadrons of the 3rd regiment of hussars, was available immediately. These troops, 2200 of the planned 3000, eventually concentrated near Bergen op Zoom for the march to France, on 2 September 1808. The remaining 800 would follow later. However, on 1 September part of the infantry rioted because of arrears in pay. The government hastily arranged an advance, which restored the peace. The brigade was sent off on 2 September by Marshal Dumonceau personally.

History of the Brigade

The march to Spain
The brigade had to march all the way to Spain. Transport by sea was impossible due to the blockade by the Royal Navy. The troops first marched to Paris, by way of Antwerp, Ghent, Lille, and Amiens. Though French authorities had promised support, it turned out that none of the local authorities had been made aware that they were to provide food and shelter. The Dutch quartermaster, O.J. Romar, was often fobbed off by the local French commanders and had to organize victualling himself. This depleted his war chest prematurely. Soldiers often had to buy food themselves from their meager pay (three stuivers a day), a sum which could not provide adequate sustenance. Hunger and fatigue caused a growing stream of stragglers. The younger officers, though they lived in more luxurious circumstances and traveled in carriages, began to criticise Chassé openly.

The brigade arrived in Saint-Denis near Paris on 19 September. At this time its strength was 2130 men and 846 horses. Chassé immediately complained to Minister Janssens about the lack of support he had received. The Minister instructed the Dutch ambassador in Paris, Admiral Verhuell, to press the French authorities to fulfil their obligations, and to pay the promised advances using the Paris bankers Audenet and Slingeland. On 20 September, the brigade paraded before Queen Hortense de Beauharnais, King Louis' estranged wife. The next day Emperor Napoleon impressed the soldiers by inspecting the brigade with Marshal Lefebvre. Napoleon used the occasion to change the organisation of the infantry battalions: their complement of nine companies was reduced to six, thereby beefing up the strength of the companies. He also decreed that the brigade would become part of the so-called German division, composed of troops from a number of German states that were allied with the French Empire, which was commanded by General Leval. This division was to become part of IV Corps under the command of Marshal Lefebvre. Finally, Napoleon organised two depots, one for the infantry in Saint-Denis, and one for the cavalry in Versailles, where stragglers and sick personnel (208 men, among whom was Major Steinmetz) were to be collected for eventual transport to their units in Spain.

The brigade left Paris for Bayonne near the Spanish border on 22 September. It marched by way of Chartres, Le Mans, Saumur, Niort and Bordeaux. This time the reception by the local population was much better and the troops were treated on a par with French troops. The brigade arrived in Bayonne on 24 October. The city had been the jumping off point for the French invasion of Spain, and was now a main staging point full of troops. The brigade managed well in the ensuing chaos. Thanks to the efforts of Quartermaster Romar, the French were persuaded to provide new uniform coats and shoes. At this point the strength of the brigade had shrunk to 1700 men.
These survivors were the strong men; the march had inadvertently eliminated the weak. Their common experiences had forged a sense of comradeship among the troops. When the brigade entered Spain the relative "pampering" ended: the brigade had to fend for itself in competition with French and allied units for food and shelter. Another unpleasant surprise was that the brigade leadership now became aware of the dangers posed by the Spanish guerillas (usually called "brigands" by the French), who continually preyed on the French supply lines. The brigade marched to Bilbao by way of Irun, Tolosa, Mondragon and Durango; it arrived in Bilbao around the end of October 1808.

Durango (31 October 1808)
Almost immediately after the brigade's arrival on Spanish soil, Marshal Lefebvre deprived General Chassé of his miners, sappers, cavalry and artillery. Chassé's protests were ineffective, despite the fact that King Louis had ordered him to keep the brigade together. The combat engineers disappeared without a trace. It later turned out that they had been ordered to improve the defenses of the citadel of Burgos. They did this conscientiously, despite the fact that their commander, Captain Lambert, was forced to pay them from his own purse. The engineers would later destroy the citadel in a rear-guard action on 10 May 1811, just before the British could enter it. The hussars were integrated into a cavalry brigade attached to the division of General Sébastiani. The infantry battalions, forming the rump of the brigade, were assigned to the division-Leval. They would represent the brigade as a fighting unit in future. Besides the Dutch troops of the regiment Nassau, this division consisted of: the regiment Baden, the regiment Hesse-Darmstadt, a battalion Frankfurt, a battalion of Parisian guards, and two batteries of artillery. Together with the division-Sébastiani, and the division-Villatte. the division-Leval formed the IVth French Corps under the command of Marshal Lefebvre; this corps was concentrated around Durango and its objective was to march on Bilbao and from there to Madrid.

However, to do this, the Spanish army of General Blake first had to be defeated. The Spanish and French armies met near Durango, in what became known as the Battle of Zornoza on 31 October 1808. The Dutch brigade had been inspected by Marshal Lefebvre on 30 October, and had been given a strong pep talk by him. Thus motivated, the Dutch troops, among the other foreign troops under the temporary command of General Villatte, faced the Spaniards. Villatte let them attack the Spaniards by moving uphill and, despite the difficult terrain, they first succeeded in driving the Spanish from the hillock of Bernagoitia, and then Nevera.  There the Dutch lit a fire to signal the French center (Sébastiani) and right wing (Leval) to start their advance. General Chassé subsequently led the pursuit of the fleeing Spaniards. In passing, Dutch voltigeurs slaughtered a flock of enemy sheep, grazing in a wood; they appreciated the meat after going without for a long time. The Dutch troops received much praise; Chassé was knighted with the Legion of Honour, and five other officers received a medal for bonne conduite et bravoure (good conduct and bravery).

After the battle, the French army pursued the Spanish in a leisurely fashion, looting along the way. On 9 November, a few days after the battle of Valmaseda, in which it did not take part, the Dutch brigade reached Valmaseda. It was in the process of being sacked in reprisal for the murder of three Frenchmen. After marching through the burning town, Dutch troops initially joined the looters, but were quickly brought under control. Captain Van Oudheusden, sabre drawn, rescued a few Spanish women from being raped by French grenadiers.

From Durango to Mesas de Ibor (17 March 1809)
Over the following months, the brigade was used mainly to perform guard and escort duties. Chassé was appointed military governor of Bilbao on 9 November and the brigade was tasked with occupation duties. Chassé himself led a reconnaissance force of 500 men in the coastal area west of Bilbao. This area had been relatively free of looting, though most of its inhabitants had fled. On 14 December, he was recalled to lead the brigade to Madrid in the train of the 4th Corps. The march across high country was hard because an extremely cold winter had set in. Foraging was difficult, because the troops that had gone before had effectively looted everything of value, and the population had fled. Madrid was reached on New Year's Eve 1808.

The logistical problems that plagued the entire invasion army, were felt even more keenly by the Dutch, as they were supplied only after the French needs were fulfilled. The Dutch cavalry, in particular, had insufficient fodder of quality for the horses, and the horses often lost shoes due to the difficult terrain. In Bilbao, only 91 of 231 horses were fit for duty. The horse artillery lost so many horses that their caissons had to be drawn by three, instead of the usual six horses. Because the Dutch infantry used a different type of musket that could not use French ammunition, a shortage of ammunition soon occurred. The younger officers blamed Chassé for being insufficiently forceful in his representations to the French corps command, and they openly showed their displeasure, which made personal relations with the general difficult. Chassé therefore removed a number of "difficult" officers, among them the chief-of-staff Vermeulen, who was replaced by Captain Van Zuylen van Nijevelt.

In Madrid, the entire German division was transferred to I Corps under the command of Marshal Victor (who was married to a Dutch woman) in January 1809. The brigade received orders to guard one of the three bridges across the Tagus river, at El Puente del Arzobispo, where they arrived at the end of January. The Dutch hussars remained with IV Corps, now commanded by General Sébastiani, and took part in, among others, the battle of Ciudad-Real of 27 March 1809, in which Colonel Roest van Alkemade was mentioned in despatches.

Meanwhile, the Dutch infantry fortified the bridge at Arzobispo under the direction of engineer officers Van Schelle and De Boer, making it impassable. But the Corps command directed them to make the bridge passable again at the end of February. Chassé, aware that Spanish troops were nearby, formed a bridgehead on the "Spanish" side of the Tagus and had his troops patrol intensively from 19 to 23 February in the Sierra de Altamira to guard against guerillas. The local guerillas, about 10,000 in number, were mostly escaped prisoners of war, former soldiers of the army of General Venegas, who had been defeated by Marshal Victor at the Battle of Uclés (1809). The German division was tasked with suppressing their activity in the area beyond the Tiétar river.

This counter-guerrilla operation, the first of its kind in the Peninsular War, soon led to excesses. The Dutch brigade became involved in a reprisal against the town of Arenas de San Pedro, where the inhabitants had "treacherously" murdered a number of Westphalian dragoons, and mutilated their bodies. The Germans' blood was up and, under the direction of Major Von Holzing, they mounted a sack of the town on 25 February 1809 during which even infants were not spared.  To the horror of their own officers, Dutch soldiers also became involved in the carnage. The officers swore that they would never allow things to get out of hand like this again. Apparently they kept their word because, as far as is known, the atrocities at Arenas are the only ones in which the Dutch troops were involved during the war.

After the Second Siege of Zaragoza had ended in a French victory on 24 February 1809, Marshal Victor decided to attack the Spanish forces on the south bank of the Tagus. He gave the German division a lead role in this attack. On 17 March 1809, the division encountered a strong Spanish force at Mesas de Ibor. General Leval first sent in the Nassau regiment against the ensconced Spaniards, but they were repulsed by heavy Spanish fire. Then Leval decided on a general attack on a broader front. The Dutch brigade was in the center, flanked by the Baden regiment on the left, and the regiment Hessen-Darmstadt on the right. Chassé ordered a bayonet attack and the Dutchmen stormed the Spanish field works without firing a shot. Though the troops suffered from grapeshot and musket fire they did not waver. Miraculously, only ten Dutch soldiers were killed and 49 wounded in the hail of fire. The Spanish troops fled from the Dutch bayonets. The rest of the Spanish front at Almaraz collapsed and the French were able to advance across the Tagus.

Medellin, Talavera and Almonacid
The French now aimed to force the Spanish army to accept battle, which they did on 28 March near Medellin. In this battle the only Dutch unit involved was the Dutch hussars, who were part of the cavalry attack that broke the Spanish line. After the very bloody battle, Major Steinmetz, tasked with collecting the weapons that had been thrown away, found more than 8,000 muskets. After the battle, the Dutch infantry was kept in reserve. Chassé was appointed military governor of the province of Trujillo in the Extremadura region, whose capital is Trujillo. Though the Dutch were able to recuperate during this more tranquil period, supplies for the troops became a problem, as the local population refused to cooperate. Quartermaster Romar therefore organized a military bakery and butchery, with Dutch bakers and butchers recruited from the ranks, to take care of the brigade's needs. Also, the paymaster received enough funds to pay the troops' arrears in pay. The relative calm caused some troops to feel the pangs of homesickness. Due to the deficient field post service, contact with home was sporadic. The soldiers did not receive many Dutch newspapers, which may have been just as well from the standpoint of morale. This precluded them from knowing that apparently nobody in the Fatherland was aware of, or cared, what was happening to them. Many soldiers and officers were pining for their homes and hoped that the brigade would soon be recalled or, failing that, that they themselves would be able to return home. Influential family members of certain officers applied pressure to have their loved-ones recalled.

The French offensive soon stalled. In June 1809, the French position in Extramadura became untenable due to the difficult supply situation and disease among the troops. I Corps gave up its position and withdrew between 14 and 19 June behind the Tagus; the Dutch were again encamped near Talavera. The Spanish troops hastened to fill the lacuna. Generals Cuesta and Venegas threatened the French from two sides, while the British expeditionary force under General Arthur Wellesley threatened to close the ring. At the end of July 1809, the Spanish and British armies met the French at the Battle of Talavera. The Dutch Brigade, as part of the division-Leval, bivouacked in an olive grove on the night of 27 July, the eve of the battle. They hardly slept because of fusillades during the night. The next day, the first attacks by the French on the British positions were repelled with heavy losses. Around noon there was a pause in the hostilities during which the French held a council of war. On the advice of Marshal Victor, the French decided not to wait for reinforcements from the corps of Marshal Soult, but to attack again in the afternoon. The division-Leval attacked the British 4th division under General Alexander Campbell. The Nassau troops were repelled and pursued by the British guards, who in turn were repelled as well. Later that afternoon the German division twice counterattacked from its base in the olive grove, but without result. The battle ended in a tactical draw, but the British retreated to Badajoz, rebuffing offers from the Spanish to pursue as they did not trust their allies to provide sufficient supplies.

The Dutch Brigade's losses at Talavera were 31 killed and 146 wounded. Most wounds became septic. The surgeons did not improve the prospects of their patients by the enthusiastic use of bloodletting. Most wounds to limbs were treated, often proactively, by amputation without anesthesia, because so many wounds became gangrenous. Major Steinmetz (by now commander of the artillery of the division-Leval), who had been ill for a very long time, died on the battlefield from complications of podagra.

After the battle of Talavera, the depleted infantry battalions, now re-organised as the 2nd regiment of infantry, were reunited with the cavalry and artillery of the brigade. The battalions were again made part of IV Corps, now commanded by the newly promoted Marshal Sébastiani. They marched to Toledo for rest and recuperation. On 11 August 1809, IV Corps left Toledo to cut off the advance of the Spanish army of General Venegas marching to Madrid. The armies met at the village of Almonacid. The Spanish army, consisting of 23,000 men and about 8,000 horses, was drawn up in a line in front of the village. Venegas had positioned artillery on two steep hills, one of which, Los Cerrojones, covered the entire battlefield. To the left of the Spanish main force, an unknown number of soldiers hid in an olive grove. Sébastiani directed the division-Leval (on the French right) to encircle Los Cerrojones. Meanwhile the French artillery fought a duel with the Spanish guns, while Polish and Dutch horse artillery attacked the Spanish detachment in the olive grove; the latter retreated from their position.

Next Sébastiani attacked the Jaén and Bailén battalions on top of the hill. First, the Spaniards repelled the Polish infantry which took heavy losses. Sébastiani then ordered Chassé to make an enveloping movement. This was countered by Spanish cavalry. The division-Leval quickly formed squares and repelled the Spanish cavalry, which suffered heavy losses. After this set-back, the Spanish troops left their positions on the hill without further resistance, leaving the main force without its wings. At this moment, King Joseph Bonaparte arrived on the scene with reinforcements for the French. Sébastiani then launched a general attack on the Spanish center with cavalry, supported by Trip's horse artillery, attacking on the Spanish right, while Chassé led the infantry against the Spanish left. Under this pressure, the Spanish troops retreated up-hill where they formed a defensive line around their artillery. Despite the murderous fire of the Spanish guns, which cut big lanes in the advancing French and allied infantry, the infantry kept advancing, and finally charged the Spanish line with their bayonets. There was a short man-to-man fight before the Spaniards fled in disarray. The Spanish lost ten standards and 26 guns, and thousands of their soldiers became prisoners of war. The Dutch hussars under Van Merlen (by now in charge of the Dutch cavalry), took part in the pursuit and captured a great number of Spanish carts and mules. King Louis was so proud of the Dutch part in the victory that he authorized that every year of service in the campaign in Spain would count double.  Though the number of losses on the French side was large (2400 killed and wounded), the Dutch brigade only lost seven killed and 37 wounded.

Ocaña and counter-guerrilla warfare
After the battle of Almonacid there was a pause in the hostilities which the Dutch Brigade sorely needed. In October 1809, Chassé reported to the army command in The Hague that the brigade had lost nine officers and 815 men. But, after the reinforcements of early 1809, there was no prospect of additional manpower. On the contrary, the Netherlands itself was involved in war due to the British landing in Zeeland, and King Louis demanded the recall of the brigade to help defend the Fatherland. The French supreme command refused. The Dutch brigade could not be released; the Kingdom of Holland would have to take care of its own defense. The Dutch army command at home, informed by private letters from officers in the brigade, had become rather dissatisfied with Chassé's policies and his "lack of firmness" in the face of French attempts to disperse the several units of the brigade. According to Minister of War Krayenhoff, this lack of resolve was, to a large extent, responsible for the low state of fitness of the brigade as many sick and wounded were lost to the brigade for all practical purposes. In February 1809 Krayenhoff had already warned that about 400 men had "disappeared" in this way. Chassé defended himself against the reproaches by pointing out that the King himself had ordered him to obey the French orders. In addition he asked for understanding of the difficult circumstances under which he had to work: supplies were lacking; clothing, shoes and medications were not available; and weakened soldiers were unable to keep up with the marching tempo. Chassé asked rhetorically: "Which barbarian would lash these exhausted men forward?" He also pointed out that the German units of the division-Leval were even more depleted.

The pause in hostilities lasted only a few weeks. General the Duke del Parque managed to defeat General Marchand at Tamames on 18 October 1809, and this made the Spanish Central Junta overconfident. They directed General Areizaga to march on Madrid from La Mancha with his army of 50,000. The French could not allow this, and on 9 November Marshal Soult ordered Polish hussars, reinforced by the horse artillery of Captain Trip, to occupy the town of Ocaña. On the way, at Dosbarrios, they met the Spanish cavalry and a fierce firefight ensued. The Poles and Dutchmen won, but the event was worrisome enough to the French command that it ordered all available units across the Tagus to stem the Spanish advance.

On 18 November, Chassé, ordered to march overnight with the Dutch brigade and the Polish cavalry from Aranjuez to Ocaña, arrived at daybreak. There, Areizaga's army was already deployed across the plain. The Spanish army had 50,000 men (though they were very fatigued after their forced marches of the previous days); the French and allies had about 30,000. Marshal Soult was in command of the French with King Joseph observing. Soult's opening move was an assault by the French left wing, consisting of Polish, German and Dutch troops, on the Spanish right. However, the Spaniards anticipated this move and launched a frontal assault that drove the French allies back to the French division-Girard behind them. The Spanish artillery fired over the heads of its own troops and caused many casualties in the division-Leval. Many horses, including Trip's, were killed, hampering his batteries of horse-artillery. However, the division-Leval managed to re-form and advance against the hail of Spanish fire. Colonel Von Pfaffenrath, commander of the two Dutch battalions, led the advance in the first line of the troops. He was accompanied by the Dutch surgeons who helped the wounded as best they could; one surgeon, Jacobsen, was killed; another, Dieudonné, though severely wounded, continued to serve.

General Leval was wounded and General Chassé assumed command of the division. The allied soldiers managed to infiltrate the ranks of the Spanish infantry, and man-to-man fights ensued which put the Spaniards on the defensive. French artillery prevented the Spanish infantry from rallying, and they broke after Polish lancers took them in the flank. A general Spanish rout ensued. Many Spanish soldiers were killed by French and allied cavalry. Many others were taken prisoner after their flight was cut short by the French 1st Corps, which had not taken part in the battle, but had just crossed the Tagus. More than 14,000 Spanish soldiers surrendered. The German division was praised extensively by the French command.  Marshal Sébastiani, in a speech to Chassé, was highly complimentary, especially of the Dutch artillerists. Trip was knighted with the Legion of Honour, and a number of Dutch officers were mentioned in dispatches. The Dutch brigade suffered relatively heavy casualties, with 82 killed and 89 wounded.

The large number of prisoners of war posed insurmountable problems for the French command. There was simply no way to feed them, and there was a good chance that there would be an attempt to liberate them by Spanish guerrillas. It was therefore decided to march the prisoners to France. The German division, now under Chassé's command, was given the unenviable task of escorting the transports. The Dutch brigade departed on 26 November with 4,000 prisoners. The Nassau and Baden regiments had already left on previous days with other transports (in total, 10,000 prisoners). To escort the transports with entire regiments would seem unnecessary, but with the number of guerrillas along the route, which went by way of Burgos and Vitoria to Bayonne, was so large, that this was certainly necessary. The prisoners were in a very sorry state. They had been robbed of all their possessions and had hardly eaten during the week they had spent in Madrid. The transport became a true "death march" during which 2,000 of the 10,000 prisoners died. This march was very distasteful to Chassé and his men, who pitied the poor wretches, but lacked the means to lessen their suffering. Accompanying the transport were several Dutch officers who had been recalled to the Netherlands. Among them was Captain Van Zuylen van Nijevelt who was replaced by the French Colonel Brenot as chief-of-staff. They arrived in Bayonne on 28 December 1809.

In the first half of 1810, the Dutch brigade was tasked with counter-guerrilla warfare in La Mancha. The guerrillas were numerous and very successful at harassing French supply lines. They operated in large bands, led by legendary leaders like El Empecinado, and "Chaleco" (the Vest). French counter-measures were largely ineffective often because their troops alienated the population with their harshness. Every action by "brigands" led to reprisals against the civilian population of nearby settlements. This caused a spiral of atrocities and reprisals. Civilians, blinded by hatred, murdered isolated patrols, gallopers, and wounded soldiers if they had a chance. The Dutch brigade was generally unsuccessful, too, though captain J.P. Sprenger, with a detachment of 100 men, defeated a troop of 900 Spanish irregular cavalry near Lerma on 24 January. However, a month later, a Dutch squad was ambushed in Segovia and disappeared without trace; only a few bandoliers were recovered. In mid-April 1810, Chassé established his headquarters in Almagro and managed to capture a flock of 15,000 merino sheep being driven to Portugal by guerrillas on orders of the Junta Central. In mid-June, he arrived with the severely depleted brigade (only 600 men, 260 horses and two guns were left) in Manzanares to fight the local guerrillas, but his troops were too exhausted to do anything noteworthy. However, a detachment under Lieutenant-Colonel Aberson occupied Villanueva de los Infantes and improvised a patrol base. When Aberson left with most of his men on one of those patrols, the local population attacked the remaining Dutchmen, who retreated to the local church. They were besieged for a few days until Chassé and Aberson relieved them. The Dutchmen plundered the church and citizenry in reprisal; they left with two cart-loads of silver.

On 9 July 1810, the Kingdom of Holland was "reunited with" (i.e. annexed to) the French Empire by decree of Emperor Napoleon. This was followed by the abolition of the royal army and its units, like the Dutch brigade, on 16 July 1810. The infantry of the Dutch brigade were absorbed into the 123rd French regiment of the line. The hussars, for the most part, had already returned to the Netherlands in February 1810). Their first task was to learn French, as their new officers could not speak Dutch. The miners and sappers became the sixth company of the French First Battalion of Miners. Some Dutch soldiers deserted. Chassé had a number of those deserters executed by firing squad in front of the troops in September 1810, at which occasion he reminded the troops that despite the dissolution of the Kingdom and the army, they were still bound (as was he) by their oaths.

Aftermath
Despite the dissolution of the brigade as a Dutch unit, the war, and the role of the Dutch soldiers in it, was not finished. The 123rd regiment remained a preponderantly Dutch unit, even under the command of French officers. Chassé was put in charge of a French brigade. From December 1810 on, they were involved unsuccessfully in the hunt for the guerrilla-leader El Chaleco, though there was some severe fighting with the guerrillas. During 1811, the left-over troops of the 123rd regiment in Spain were placed 'a la suite', meaning they were surplus, and could be re-designated. They were incorporated into either the 1st, 3rd or 6th Bataillon Auxiliaire de l'Armee du Nord, which were used to form the 130th Regiment of the line, which continued to fight in Spain, being present at the Siege of Burgos in 1812, the fighting around Pamplona and in the Pyrenees in 1813, and the Battle of Bayonne in 1814. By then, there were preciously few Dutchmen left. As early as January 1812, only 800 Dutch infantrymen were left in Spain.  Meanwhile, the other, newly formed battalions of the 123rd regiment, augmented with new Dutch conscripts, became part of the army with which Napoleon invaded Russia in June 1812. There were no Dutch Peninsular veterans amongst those battalions, however. Some battalions of the 123rd Regiment became part of the brigade Coutard in the division-Merle of II Corps, commanded by Marshal Oudinot. On 19 October 1812, it was part of the rear-guard that covered the retreat of the Corps across the Dvina river at the Second Battle of Polotsk and so distinguished itself that "Polotsk" is one of the battle honors on the standard of the regiment. At the Battle of Berezina it again formed part of the rear-guard that was sacrificed to cover the French retreat. At the beginning of the battle the regiment still had 100 men fit for duty; after the battle it no longer existed. "Berezina" is another of the modern French regiment's battle honors.
Chassé, in the meantime, had been commanding French troops during the Battle of Vitoria and the Battle of Maya, and was recalled to fight in France in 1814, serving with distinction at the Battle of Bar-sur-Aube and the Battle of Arcis-sur-Aube.

All in all, only a few of the Dutch veterans of the Peninsular War returned to the Netherlands.
Among the returnees was general Chassé who, despite his personal misgivings about the Annexation, had remained in French service in Spain. At first he was promoted sideways to général de brigade. He made rapid career steps because of his abilities, however, and ended up as a Lieutenant-General. After Napoleon's abdication he asked to be allowed to resign from the French service. He then offered his services to the new government of the Netherlands, which was only too happy to accept him. As a Dutch Lieutenant-General, and commander of the Third Netherlands division, he played an important part in the Battle of Waterloo. Not surprisingly, he ordered a bayonet charge, which he led on horseback, with the brigade-Detmers, supposedly on the French Moyenne Garde, but possibly on troops of the brigade commanded by general Jean Gaudens Claude Pégot, in a decisive phase of the battle.

See also
Guerrilla warfare in the Peninsular War

Notes

References

Military history of the Netherlands
Military units and formations of the Peninsular War
French military units and formations of the Napoleonic Wars
Kingdom of Holland